Cole Park is a Grade II* listed moated country house off Grange Lane, in the parish of St Paul Malmesbury Without, about  south of Malmesbury, Wiltshire, England. It stands on land once known as Cowfold that was owned in the Middle Ages by the Abbey of Malmesbury, and in the Tudor period was a royal stud.

History

The house is in the grounds of a former medieval monastic deer-park, originally known as Cowfold, once owned by the Abbey of Malmesbury. William of Colerne was the abbot from 1260 to 1296, from whom the name Cole Park may derive. The abbey had a lodge on the site which was still standing in 1540.

The estate passed to the Crown at the Dissolution, and in the Tudor period Cole Park was a royal stud-farm, which in 1625 was leased by Sir George Marshall. In the 1650s the Crown sold it to Hugh Audley, and the property passed down to the Harvey and Lovell families until it was sold (together with Rodbourne Rail farm) in 1945.

The earliest extant parts of the house date to the mid-sixteenth century but it has been extensively renovated and changed during its history. The house was altered by John Harvey around 1700 and again in 1775–6 for John and Sarah Lovell. It was repaired in 1796 for Peter Lovell and in the modern era had a complete refurbishment in 1981 by William Bertram. It was purchased by the financier Sir Mark Weinberg and his wife, the designer Anouska Hempel, in the mid-1980s.

The house was recorded as Grade II* listed in 1951.

References

Further reading
 Masson, Madeleine. (1985) A history of Cole Park at St Paul's Without Malmesbury, Wiltshire. Merrick, 1985.

Grade II* listed buildings in Wiltshire
Grade II* listed houses
Country houses in Wiltshire
Malmesbury
Buildings and structures completed in the 16th century
Malmesbury Abbey